The Idaho Light Foot Militia (ILFM) is a privately organized militia in the state of Idaho. The Idaho Light Foot Militia is distinct from a state defense force in that it is not recognized as part of the organized militia by the government of Idaho, but is rather privately organized by private citizens in the unorganized militia. The ILFM was founded in 2009.

Organization
The Southern Poverty Law Center lists them as one of 1274 patriot groups that "engage in groundless conspiracy theorizing, or advocate or adhere to extreme anti-government doctrines. The Members of the militia believe they are the "teeth of the Constitution" at a time of economic and political uncertainty for the United States.

Membership
Members participate in training and attend monthly meetings. As of 2021, the militia consisted of over 600 members.

References

External links

Paramilitary organizations based in the United States
2009 establishments in Idaho
Patriot movement
Right-wing militia organizations in the United States
Organizations based in Idaho